Sodium diuranate, Na2U2O7·6H2O, is a uranium salt also known as the yellow oxide of uranium. Sodium diuranate is commonly referred to by the initials SDU. Along with ammonium diuranate it was a component in early yellowcakes. The ratio of the two compounds is determined by process conditions; however, yellowcake is now largely a mix of uranium oxides.

Preparation 
In the classical procedure for extracting uranium, pitchblende is broken up and mixed with sulfuric and nitric acids. The uranium dissolves to form uranyl sulfate and sodium carbonate is added to precipitate impurities. If the uranium in the ore is in the tetravalent oxidation state, an oxidiser is added to oxidise it to the hexavalent oxidation state, and sodium hydroxide is then added to make the uranium precipitate as sodium diuranate. 
The alkaline process of milling uranium ores involves precipitating sodium uranate from the pregnant leaching solution to produce the semi-refined product referred to as yellowcake.

These older methods of extracting uranium from its uraninite ores has been replaced in current practice by such procedures as solvent extraction, ion exchange, and volatility methods.

Sodium uranate may be obtained in the amorphous form by heating together urano-uranic oxide and sodium chlorate; or by heating sodium uranyl acetate or carbonate. The crystalline form is produced by adding the green oxide in small quantities to fused sodium chloride, or by dissolving the amorphous form in fused sodium chloride, and allowing crystallization to take place. It yields reddish-yellow to greenish-yellow prisms or leaflets.

Uses 

In the past it was widely used to produce uranium glass or vaseline glass, the sodium salt dissolving easily into the silica matrix during the firing of the initial melt.

It was also used in porcelain dentures to give them a fluorescence similar to that of natural teeth and once used in pottery to produce ivory to yellow shades in glazes. It was added to these products as a mix with cerium oxide. The final uranium composition was from 0.008 to 0.1% by weight uranium with an average of about 0.02%. The practice appears to have stopped in the late 1980s.

References

External links
NRC Glossary
Sodium Uranate Heats of Formation
MSDS
 

Sodium compounds
Uranates
Nuclear materials